Branko Pleše (12 January 1915 – 28 March 1980), nicknamed Isusek, was a Croatian footballer who played international football for the Croatian and both the royal and communist Yugoslavian national teams.

Playing career

Club
He began his career with HŠK Concordia before moving to Građanski Zagreb in 1935. Pleše played with Građanski as a striker until its disbanding in 1945. In 1937 and 1940 he was Yugoslavian champion, while in 1941 and 1943 he was champion of Croatia. In 1945 he joined the newly formed Dinamo Zagreb with whom he played until 1950. He was Yugoslavian champion again in 1948.

International
During his international career with the Kingdom of Yugoslavia he was capped 5 times. During the existence of the Independent State of Croatia, a World War II-era puppet state of Nazi Germany, he was capped for the Croatian national team 13 times, scoring three goals. Finally, he played for Communist Yugoslavia once, in its first game.

Managerial career
He later moved to management, during which time he managed FK Sloboda Tuzla among others.

References

External links
 
 
 
 

1915 births
1980 deaths
People from Primorje-Gorski Kotar County
Association football midfielders
Yugoslav footballers
Yugoslavia international footballers
Croatian footballers
Croatia international footballers
Dual internationalists (football)
HŠK Concordia players
HŠK Građanski Zagreb players
GNK Dinamo Zagreb players
Yugoslav First League players
Yugoslav football managers
FK Sloboda Tuzla managers
Burials at Mirogoj Cemetery